Box of Shadows (aka The Ghostmaker) is an American fantasy thriller film directed by Mauro Borrelli, produced by Ed Polgardy and Scott Rudolph and written from Borelli and Scott Svatos. The film stars Domiziano Arcangeli, Ford Austin and Naomi Ueno.

Plot
A group of young college students find an old 15th-century coffin, which is equipped with a part clockwork-mechanical/supernatural contraption that enables contact with spirits and even allows one to experience becoming a ghost for a period of time, whilst cheating death's grasp. Their first adventures in this mystery world brought by said 'box of shadows' is just innocent playful fun. But the casket soon brings out their more purely evil side, manifesting their more dangerous impulses and darker desires. Plus, seeing as they are essentially cheating death when they're in that induced ghostly state, 'Death' itself soon comes to claim their decaying souls. A reminder that 'cheating death' is never an option. Eventually showing the group that the thin line between life and death exists for a very specific reason.

Cast
 Aaron Dean Eisenberg as Kyle
 Liz Fenning as Julie
 J. Walter Holland as Sutton
 Jared Grey as Platt
 Domiziano Arcangeli as Marcus
 Hans Uder as Armaddan
 Wes Aderhold as Young man
 Ruby Staley as Young Woman
 Desmond Lawrence as Policeman
 Ford Austin as The Detective
 Edurne Ganem as Gina
 Scott Svatos as Internet Professor
 Chandler Maness as Reaper
 Edoardo Beghi as Tony
 Naomi Ueno as Asian Girl
 Matthias Balke as Boxing Trainer
 Paul Louis Harrell as Boxing Trainer
 Ian Scott Rudolph as Boxing Trainer
 Mauro Borrelli as Angry Driver
 Ed Polgardy as Elevator Guy
 Vin Nucatola as Arresting Officer
 Brad Littlefield as Manolo
 Erskine Bonilla as Boxer
 Hilary Novelle as Waitress
 Karen Teliha as Old Woman
 Don Yanan as Shopkeeper

Production
Ed Polgardy, Scott Rudolph and Ford Austin produced for Fotocomics Production. The casting began on July 6, 2009 in Burbank, California and the director found Aaron Dean Eisenberg and Liz Fenning for the leads. Director Mauro Borelli began shooting on June 29, 2009 in Reseda and Sun Valley.

References

External links 
 
 
  
 

2011 films
American science fiction thriller films
Films shot in Los Angeles
American ghost films
American independent films
American supernatural thriller films
2010s ghost films
2010s English-language films
Films directed by Mauro Borrelli
2010s American films